The Anglo-Iraqi Treaty of 1948, or Portsmouth Treaty of 1948, was a treaty between Iraq and United Kingdom signed in Portsmouth on 15 January 1948. It was a revision of the Anglo-Iraqi Treaty of 1930.

During World War II, the British had reoccupied Iraq to reverse a pro-Axis coup that had taken place in 1941. By the Treaty of Portsmouth, Sayyid Salih Jabr negotiated British withdrawal from Iraq. However, the agreement consisted of a joint British and Iraqi defence board to oversee Iraq's military planning. Additionally, the British continued to control Iraqi foreign affairs. 

At the time of signing, Britain's strategic goal was to form an Arab bloc that would be anti-Soviet and pro-British. After it had convinced Syria, Jordan and Egypt to join, Britain conceded Mandatory Palestine, that the United Nations had approved its partition of into Arab and Jewish states, to Iraq. A military plan was agreed upon by which two Iraqi divisions, armed with modern British weapons, would sweep through Syria and Jordan and join the Arab Legion of Jordan to conquer the planned Jewish and Arab states. 

Iraq would still be tied to the British for military supplies and training until 1973, which could not be accepted by Arab nationalists in Iraq. As a staunch reaction to the treaty, Iraqis led the Al-Wathbah uprising against the continued British presence in Iraq. Al-Said repudiated the treaty as a concession offered to the Iraqi and Arab nationalists. 

The treaty was repudiated after the Free Officers coup in 1958 removed Faisal II from power, and his pro-Western policies were reversed.

References

Treaties of the Kingdom of Iraq
Bilateral treaties of the United Kingdom
Treaties concluded in 1948
Iraq–United Kingdom relations
1948 in Iraq
1948 in the United Kingdom
1948 in British law
January 1948 events in the United Kingdom